HMS Despatch was a  light cruiser built for the Royal Navy during World War I. She was part of the Delhi sub-class of the Danae class.

Design and description
The Delhi sub-class was identical with the preceding ships except that their bows were raised for better seakeeping. She carried  tons of fuel oil. The ship had a crew of about 450 officers and other ranks.

Despatch was armed with six centreline BL 6-inch (152 mm) Mk XII guns. One superfiring pair of guns was forward of the bridge, another pair were fore and aft of the two funnels and the last two were in the stern, with one gun superfiring over the rearmost gun. The two QF 4 inch Mk V naval gun anti-aircraft guns were positioned on elevated platforms between the funnels and the QF 2-pounder "pom-pom" AA guns were amidships on the upper deck. The ships were equipped with a dozen  torpedo tubes in four triple mounts, two on each broadside.

Construction and career
She was laid down by Fairfield Shipbuilding and Engineering Company on 8 July 1918, launched on 24 September 1919, towed to Chatham Dockyard, and completed there on 15 June 1922.

Despatch had a relatively quiet wartime career, compared to her sisters.  She was operating in the South Atlantic for the early part of the war, where she captured the German freighter  and intercepted the German merchant ship . The crew of  Troja scuttled her, however, before the ship could be captured. She was in the Mediterranean, escorting convoys in late 1940, and became involved in Operation White and the Battle of Cape Spartivento. By the battle of Cape Spartivento as part of Force "B", a sub-unit of Force "H", Gibraltar.

18.2.43. - At 13.45hrs HMS Despatch intercepted Spanish ship Monte Naranco in position 14-42N, 23-01W and placed an armed guard aboard and ordered the Greek destroyer HHelMS Adrias to escort her for one day towards Gibraltar.

Despatch was present at the Normandy landings in June 1944. She was the headquarters ship for the Mulberry harbours. Whilst at Mulberry 'B' Despatch was present for the visit of H.M. King George VI. For her HQ Ship role, Despatch had had all her original guns removed and replaced with 16 Bofors 40 mm Anti-Aircraft guns manned by army gunners from 127th (Queen's) Light Anti-Aircraft Regiment, Royal Artillery, to support her role as "Traffic Control" in building the Mulberry Harbour at Arromanches. Commander White was allocated landing pass "number one" for Arromanches.

Despatch was reduced to reserve in January 1945, and sold on 5 April 1946 for scrapping.  She arrived at the yards of Arnott Young, of Troon, Scotland on 5 May 1946 to be broken up.

Notes

Bibliography 
 
 
 
 
 
 
 
 Routledge, Brigadier N.W. (1994) History of the Royal Regiment of Artillery: Anti-Aircraft Artillery 1914–55, London: Royal Artillery Institution/Brassey's, .

External links

HMS Despatch at U-boat.net
Ships of the Danae class

 

Danae-class cruisers of the Royal Navy
Ships built in Chatham
Ships built in Govan
1919 ships
World War II naval ships of the United Kingdom
World War II cruisers of the United Kingdom